Nashik Division is one of the six divisions of India's Maharashtra state and four of its five districts form Uttar Maharashtra. The three northernmost districts of Uttar Maharashtra form most of the historic Khandesh region which covers the northern part of the division in the valley of the Tapti River. Nashik Division is bound by Konkan Division and the state of Gujarat to the west, Madhya Pradesh state to the north, Amravati Division and Marathwada (Aurangabad Division) to the east, and Desh (Pune Division) to the south.

Districts
 Ahmednagar District
 Dhule District
 Jalgaon District
 Nandurbar District
 Nashik District

Subdivisions
There are 54 tehsils of 5 districts are divided into 28 subdivisions in Nashik division.

Transport

Air
 Nashik Airport is well connected by direct flights to Pune and Ahmedabad. 
 Jalgaon Airport is well connected by direct flights to Mumbai and Ahmedabad.
 Shirdi Airport is an airport in Ahmednagar district.

Rail
 Nashik Road, Bhusawal, and Jalgaon are major railway stations in the region.

List of Divisional Commissioners
 J. G. Rajadhyaksha 20-02-1981 to 30-09-1984
 J. D. Jadhav 12-12-1984 to 01-12-1985
 Leena Mehendale 28-06-1994 to 28-11-1995
 Kishore Gajbhiye 19-01-2004 to 05-01-2004
 Eknath Dawale 11-02-2014

References

External links 
 http://www.jalgaon.co.in 
 https://web.archive.org/web/20150405153304/http://www.nashik.nic.in/htmldocs/disoverview.htm

 
Divisions of Maharashtra